The 2020 United States House of Representatives elections in Illinois were held on November 3, 2020, to elect the 18 U.S. representatives from the state of Illinois, one from each of the state's 18 congressional districts. The elections coincided with the 2020 U.S. presidential election, as well as other elections to the House of Representatives, elections to the United States Senate, various state and local elections, and the Illinois Fair Tax.

Statewide

By district
Results of the 2020 United States House of Representatives elections in Illinois by district:

District 1

The 1st district takes in the South Side of Chicago, the southern suburbs of Chicago, and continues southwest to Joliet. The incumbent is Democrat Bobby Rush, who was re-elected with 73.5% of the vote in 2018.

Democratic primary

Candidates

Nominee
 Bobby Rush, incumbent U.S. Representative

Eliminated in primary
 Robert Emmons Jr., nonprofit executive
 Sarah Gad, law student and opioid recovery advocate
 Ameena Matthews, community activist

Endorsements

Primary results

Republican primary

Nominee
 Philanise White, renal technician

Primary results

Third parties

Removed
 Ruth Pellegrini (Independent)

General election

Predictions

Results

District 2

The 2nd district encompasses South Side Chicago and its southern suburbs, including eastern Will County and Kankakee County. The incumbent is Democrat Robin Kelly, who was re-elected with 81.1% of the vote in 2018.

Democratic primary

Candidates

Nominee
 Robin Kelly, incumbent U.S. Representative

Eliminated in primary
 Marcus Lewis, postal worker

Primary results

Republican primary

Candidates

Nominee
 Theresa Raborn, activist

Primary results

General election

Predictions

Results

District 3

The 3rd district includes western and southwestern suburbs of Chicago as far as the DuPage County border, as well part of southwest Chicago itself. The incumbent is Democrat Dan Lipinski, who was re-elected with 73.0% of the vote in 2018. On March 17, 2020, Marie Newman defeated Dan Lipinski in the Democratic primary in a rematch of their 2018 race.

Democratic primary

Candidates

Nominee
 Marie Newman, businesswoman and candidate for Illinois's 3rd congressional district in 2018

Eliminated in primary
 Rush Darwish, photographer and former broadcaster
 Charles Hughes
 Dan Lipinski, incumbent U.S. Representative

Withdrawn
 Abe Matthew, attorney (endorsed Newman)

Endorsements

Polling

Primary results

Republican primary

Candidates

Nominee
 Mike Fricilone, Republican minority leader of the Will County Board

Eliminated in primary
 Arthur Jones, former chairman of the American Nazi Party, Holocaust denier, white supremacist, and nominee for Illinois's 3rd congressional district in 2018
 Catherine O'Shea, real estate broker

Endorsements

Primary results

General election

Predictions

Polling

Results

District 4

The 4th district takes in the heavily Hispanic areas of West Side and South Side Chicago. The incumbent is Democrat Chuy García, who was elected with 86.6% of the vote in 2018.

Democratic primary

Candidates

Nominee
 Chuy García, incumbent U.S. Representative

Primary results

Republican primary

Candidates
Christopher Lasky was originally the only Republican Candidate to file, and was the sole Republican Candidate in the primary. Lasky died December 23, 2019, but remained on the ballot as the only candidate winning the nomination, and the Illinois Republican Party nominated Jesus Solorio as his replacement.

Nominee
 Jesus E. Solorio Jr., Chicago Republican Party Vice-chair and 23rd Ward Republican Committeeman (nominated by party)

Winner in primary
 Christopher Lasky, former member of the board of trustees for the Stickney-Forest View Public Library District (Deceased, December 23, 2019)

Primary results

General election

Predictions

Results

District 5

The 5th district is based in North Side Chicago and its northern and western suburbs, including Elmhurst, Elmwood Park, Franklin Park, Hinsdale, La Grange Park, Norridge, Northlake, River Grove, Schiller Park, and Oakbrook Terrace. The incumbent is Democrat Mike Quigley, who was re-elected with 76.7% of the vote in 2018.

Democratic primary

Candidates

Nominee
 Mike Quigley, incumbent U.S. Representative

Eliminated in primary
 Brian Burns, attorney

Primary results

Republican primary

Candidates

Nominee
 Tom Hanson, nominee for Illinois's 5th congressional district in 2018

Eliminated in primary
 Kimball Ladien

Primary results

General election

Predictions

Results

District 6

The 6th district encompasses the western Chicago suburbs, and includes parts of Cook, DuPage, Lake, Kane, and McHenry counties. The incumbent is Democrat Sean Casten, who flipped the district and was elected with 53.6% of the vote in 2018.

Democratic primary

Candidates

Nominee
 Sean Casten, incumbent U.S. Representative

Endorsements

Primary results

Republican primary

Candidates

Nominee
 Jeanne Ives, former state representative and Republican primary candidate for Governor of Illinois in 2018

Eliminated in primary
 Jay Kinzler, transplant surgeon and U.S. Army Reserve colonel

Withdrawn
 Evelyn Sanguinetti, former Lieutenant Governor of Illinois

Declined
 Greg Hart, DuPage County board member

Endorsements

Primary results

General election

Predictions

Polling

with Generic Democrat and Generic Republican

Results

District 7

The 7th district encompasses West Side Chicago and downtown Chicago, including Bellwood, Forest Park, Oak Park, Maywood, and Westchester. The incumbent is Democrat Danny K. Davis, who was re-elected with 87.6% of the vote in 2018.

Democratic primary

Candidates

Nominee
 Danny K. Davis, incumbent U.S. Representative

Eliminated in primary
 Anthony Clark, teacher, community activist, and candidate for Illinois's 7th congressional district in 2018
 Kina Collins, community organizer and gun control activist
 Kristine Schanbacher, attorney

Endorsements

Primary results

Republican primary

Candidates

Nominee
 Craig Cameron, candidate for Illinois's 7th congressional district in 2018

Primary results

Third parties

Candidates
 Tracy Jennings (Independent), former public service administrator

General election

Predictions

Results

District 8

The 8th district is based in the northwestern suburbs of Chicago. The incumbent is Democrat Raja Krishnamoorthi, who was re-elected with 66.0% of the vote in 2018.

Democratic primary

Candidates

Nominee
 Raja Krishnamoorthi, incumbent U.S. Representative

Eliminated in primary
 Inam Hussain, social worker
 William Olson

Primary results

Republican primary

Write-in candidates
 Joseph J Hantsch
 Richard Mayers

Primary results

Third Parties

Libertarian Party

Nominee
 Preston Gabriel Nelson, inventor

General election

Predictions

Results

District 9

The 9th district is based in the northern Chicago suburbs, including all or parts of Arlington Heights, Des Plaines, Evanston, Glenview, Lincolnwood, Morton Grove, Mount Prospect, Niles, Park Ridge, Prospect Heights, Skokie, Wilmette, and Winnetka. The incumbent is Democrat Jan Schakowsky, who was re-elected with 73.5% of the vote in 2018.

Democratic primary

Candidates

Nominee
 Jan Schakowsky, incumbent U.S. Representative

Democratic primary

Primary results

Republican primary

Candidates

Nominee
 Sargis Sangari, former U.S. Army Lieutenant Colonel

Primary results

General election

Predictions

Results

District 10

The 10th district encompasses the North Shore and the northwestern suburbs of Chicago. The incumbent is Democrat Brad Schneider, who was re-elected with 65.6% of the vote in 2018.

Democratic primary

Candidates

Nominee
 Brad Schneider, incumbent U.S. Representative

Withdrawn
 Andrew Wang, progressive activist

Primary results

Republican primary

Candidates

Nominee
 Valerie Ramirez Mukherjee, venture capitalist

Primary results

General election

Predictions

Results

District 11

The 11th district covers the southwestern and western Chicago suburbs, including all or parts of Aurora, Bolingbrook, Darien, Joliet, Montgomery, Naperville, Lisle, Downers Grove, New Lenox, Shorewood, and Woodridge. The incumbent is Democrat Bill Foster, who was re-elected with 63.8% of the vote in 2018.

Democratic primary

Candidates

Nominee
 Bill Foster, incumbent U.S. Representative

Eliminated in primary
 Rachel Ventura, Will County board member

Endorsements

Primary results

Republican primary

Candidates

Nominee
 Rick Laib, police sergeant with the Will County Sheriff's Office

Eliminated in primary
 Krishna Bansal, member of the Naperville Zoning and Planning Commission

Endorsements

Primary results

General election

Predictions

Results

District 12

The 12th district takes in southwestern Illinois, taking in the suburbs of St. Louis and Metro Lakeland. The incumbent is Republican Mike Bost, who was re-elected with 51.6% of the vote in 2018.

Republican primary

Candidates

Nominee
 Mike Bost, incumbent U.S. Representative

Primary results

Democratic primary

Candidates

Nominee
 Raymond Lenzi, former chancellor of Southern Illinois University

Eliminated in primary
 Joel Funk, financial consultant and U.S. Army veteran

Primary results

General election

Predictions

Endorsements

Results

District 13

The 13th district encompasses parts of Bond, Champaign, Madison, McLean, and Sangamon counties, and all of Christian, Calhoun, De Witt, Greene, Jersey, Macon, Macoupin, Montgomery, and Piatt counties, including all or parts of the cities of Bloomington, Champaign, Decatur, Godfrey, Springfield, Taylorville, and Urbana. The incumbent is Republican Rodney Davis, who was re-elected with 50.4% of the vote in 2018.

Republican primary

Candidates

Nominee
 Rodney Davis, incumbent U.S. Representative

Primary results

Democratic primary

Candidates

Nominee
 Betsy Dirksen Londrigan, former nonprofit leader, entrepreneur, and nominee for Illinois's 13th congressional district in 2018

Eliminated in primary
 Stefanie Smith, former sex worker and activist

Primary results

General election

Predictions

Endorsements

Polling

Results

District 14

The 14th district encompasses the western Chicago exurbs, including all or parts of Batavia, Campton Hills, Crystal Lake, Geneva, Huntley, McHenry, Naperville, St. Charles, North Aurora, Oswego, Plainfield, Plano, Sycamore, Warrenville, Wauconda, Woodstock, and Yorkville. The incumbent is Democrat Lauren Underwood, who flipped the district and was elected with 52.5% of the vote in 2018.

On November 12, the race was called by the Associated Press for Underwood. On January 5, 2021, Jim Oberweis filed notice with the U.S. House of Representatives challenging the results of the election.

Democratic primary

Candidates

Nominee
 Lauren Underwood, incumbent U.S. Representative, former Senior Advisor at the Department of Health and Human Services, and registered nurse

Endorsements

Primary results

Republican primary

Nominee 
 Jim Oberweis, state senator, nominee for U.S. Senate in 2014, nominee for Illinois's 14th congressional district in 2008, candidate for governor in 2006, and candidate for U.S. Senate in 2002 and 2004

Eliminated in primary 
 Anthony Catella, U.S. Army veteran
 Jerry Evans
 Ted Gradel, businessman and youth basketball coach
 Catalina Lauf, former special adviser to U.S. Department of Commerce
 Jim Marter, businessman, former chairman of the Kendall County Republican Party, and candidate for U.S. Senate in 2016
 Sue Rezin, state senator

Withdrawn 
 Danny Malouf, human resource director
 Matt Quigley, U.S. Navy veteran

Declined 
 Allen Skillicorn, state representative

Endorsements

Polling

Primary results

General election

Predictions

Polling

Results

District 15

The 15th district encompasses rural east-central and southeastern Illinois. The incumbent is Republican John Shimkus, who was re-elected with 70.9% of the vote in 2018. Shimkus announced he would not be seeking re-election on August 30, 2019. After briefly considering reversing his retirement plans, Shimkus reaffirmed his decision to not run on November 4, 2019.

Republican primary

Candidates

Nominee
 Mary Miller, Oakland farm owner

Eliminated in primary
 Darren Duncan, Vermilion County treasurer
 Charles Ellington, family physician
 Kerry Wolff, vice president of the Altamont school board

Withdrawn
 Alex Walker, U.S. Air Force Veteran

Declined
 Erika Harold, nominee for Illinois Attorney General in 2018 and former Miss America
 Mike Marron, state representative
 Kyle McCarter, U.S. Ambassador to Kenya and former state senator
 Dale Righter, state senator
 Chapin Rose, state senator
 John Shimkus, incumbent U.S. Representative

Primary results

Democratic primary

Candidates

Nominee
 Erika Weaver, member of the Mattoon school board

Eliminated in primary
 Kevin Gaither, nominee for Illinois's 15th congressional district in 2018
 John W. Hursey, Jr., community activist
 Craig Morton, Salem city councilman

Primary results

General election

Endorsements

Predictions

Results

District 16

The 16th district encompasses north-central Illinois, taking in the east side of Rockford, Belvidere, Ottawa, and DeKalb. The incumbent is Republican Adam Kinzinger, who was re-elected with 59.1% of the vote in 2018.

Republican primary

Candidates

Nominee
 Adam Kinzinger, incumbent U.S. Representative

Primary results

Democratic primary

Candidates

Nominee
 Dani Brzozowski, activist and chairwoman of LaSalle County Democrats

Primary results

Endorsements

General election

Predictions

Results

District 17

The 17th district encompasses northwestern Illinois, including the Quad cities metro, the westside of Rockford, and Peoria. Democratic incumbent Cheri Bustos was re-elected with 52.0% of the vote while the district voted for Donald Trump in the concurrently-held presidential election by 1.6%, making it one of only seven Trump-won districts held by a Democrat in the 117th Congress.

Democratic primary

Candidates

Nominee
 Cheri Bustos, incumbent U.S. Representative

Eliminated in primary
 Spanky Edwards, chairman of the Youth Works Committee of the Illinois branch of the NAACP

Primary results

Republican primary

Candidates

Nominee
 Esther Joy King, attorney and businesswoman

Eliminated in primary
 Bill Fawell, real estate broker and nominee for Illinois's 17th congressional district in 2018

Primary results

Endorsements

General election

Predictions

Polling

Results

District 18

The 18th district covers rural west-central Illinois, including Jacksonville, Quincy, and parts of Bloomington, Peoria, and Springfield. The incumbent is Republican Darin LaHood, who was re-elected with 67.2% of the vote in 2018.

Republican primary

Candidates

Nominee
 Darin LaHood, incumbent U.S. Representative

Primary results

Democratic primary
After the primaries ended, Democratic Party leaders in the district placed George Petrilli, an attorney, on the ballot.

Withdrawn
 Mark Haasis, former national organizer for United Automobile Workers

General election

Predictions

Results

Notes 

 Partisan clients

References

External links
 
 
  (State affiliate of the U.S. League of Women Voters)
 

Find your district/elected officials
 Find your district/elected officials 

Official campaign websites for 1st district candidates
 Ruth Pellegrini (I) for Congress
 Bobby Rush (D) for Congress
 Philanise White (R) for Congress

Official campaign websites for 2nd district candidates
 Robin Kelly (D) for Congress
 Theresa Raborn (R) for Congress 

Official campaign websites for 3rd district candidates
 Mike Fricilone (R) for Congress 
 Marie Newman (D) for Congress

Official campaign websites for 4th district candidates
 Jesús "Chuy" García (D) for Congress
 Jesus E. Solorio Jr. (R) for Congress

Official campaign websites for 5th district candidates
 Mike Quigley (D) for Congress
 Thomas J. Wilda (G) for Congress

Official campaign websites for 6th district candidates
 Sean Casten (D) for Congress
 Jeanne Ives (R) for Congress
 Bill Redpath (L) for Congress

Official campaign websites for 7th district candidates
 Craig Cameron (R) for Congress
 Danny K. Davis (D) for Congress
 Tracy Jennings (I) for Congress

Official campaign websites for 8th district candidates
 Raja Krishnamoorthi (D) for Congress
 Preston Gabriel Nelson (L) for Congress

Official campaign websites for 9th district candidates
 Sargis Sangari (R) for Congress
 Jan Schakowsky (D) for Congress

Official campaign websites for 10th district candidates
 Brad Schneider (D) for Congress
 Valerie Ramirez Mukherjee (R) for Congress

Official campaign websites for 11th district candidates
 Bill Foster (D) for Congress
 Rick Laib (R) for Congress

Official campaign websites for 12th district candidates
 Mike Bost (R) for Congress
 Raymond Lenzi (D) for Congress

Official campaign websites for 13th district candidates
 Rodney Davis (R) for Congress
 Betsy Dirksen Londrigan (D) for Congress

Official campaign websites for 14th district candidates
 Jim Oberweis (R) for Congress
 Lauren Underwood (D) for Congress

Official campaign websites for 15th district candidates
 Mary Miller (R) for Congress
 Erika Weaver (D) for Congress

Official campaign websites for 16th district candidates
 Dani Brzozowski (D) for Congress 
 Adam Kinzinger (R) for Congress

Official campaign websites for 17th district candidates
 Cheri Bustos (D) for Congress
 Esther Joy King (R) for Congress

Official campaign websites for 18th district candidates
 Darin LaHood (R) for Congress
 George Petrilli (D) for Congress

Illinois
2020
House